Ramón Camallonga (born 1 December 1968) is a Spanish former breaststroke swimmer who competed in the 1988 Summer Olympics and in the 1992 Summer Olympics.

References

1968 births
Living people
Spanish male breaststroke swimmers
Olympic swimmers of Spain
Swimmers at the 1988 Summer Olympics
Swimmers at the 1992 Summer Olympics
Mediterranean Games silver medalists for Spain
Mediterranean Games medalists in swimming
Swimmers at the 1993 Mediterranean Games